English singer and songwriter Lily Allen has released four studio albums, two extended plays, 23 singles (including six as a featured artist), two promotional singles and 21 music videos. Allen's range of musical genres incorporates styles such as pop, ska, electropop and reggae fusion. She became well known through her Myspace account, on which she started posting demo songs in 2005. The increase of popularity led to a contract with Regal Recordings. Her debut single, "Smile", was released in 2006 and topped the UK Singles Chart for two weeks. Allen's first studio album, Alright, Still (2006), was released shortly after. The album was commercially successful, earning a three times platinum certification in the United Kingdom, and gold in the United States. The album was nominated for Best Alternative Music Album at the 50th Grammy Awards. Follow-up singles "LDN", "Littlest Things" and "Alfie" did not repeat her early success, although they still sold well; "LDN" peaked at number six on the UK Singles Chart.

Released in 2009, Allen's second major release, It's Not Me, It's You, saw a genre shift for her, having more of an electropop feel, rather than the ska and reggae influences of the first one. The album debuted at number one on the UK Albums Chart, the Australian Albums Chart and the Canadian Albums Chart. The first single from it, "The Fear", also debuted at number one on the UK Singles Chart, where it remained for four consecutive weeks. Other singles include "Not Fair", another top 10 single in the UK, "Fuck You", which became her third chart entry on the US Billboard Hot 100, peaking at 68, "22" and her more recent "Who'd Have Known". Allen's first extended play, F.U.E.P., was released in March 2009 and her second, Paris Live Session, in November of the same year.

In May 2014, after a five-year hiatus from music, she released her third album, Sheezus, which contains a diverse mix of genres, including bubblegum pop and synth-pop. It debuted at number one on the UK Albums Chart, being Allen's second consecutive number one in the UK, and entered the top five on the Australian Albums Chart and the Irish Albums Chart. It also peaked at number 12 on the Billboard 200. Its lead single, "Hard out Here", was released on 17 November 2013 and peaked at number nine on the UK Singles Chart, giving Allen two simultaneous top 10 singles, along with "Somewhere Only We Know", which stayed at number one for three non-consecutive weeks. The second single, "Air Balloon", was released on 20 January 2014, and reached number seven on the UK Singles Chart. Other released singles were "Our Time", "URL Badman" and "As Long as I Got You".

Allen's fourth album No Shame was released in June 2018. In addition to electropop, the album utilises elements of dancehall and reggae. No Shame reached number eight on the UK Albums Chart and Australian Albums Chart. The song "Trigger Bang" was promoted as a single from the record.

Studio albums

Extended plays

Singles

As lead artist

As featured artist

Promotional singles

Other charted songs

Guest appearances

Music videos

As lead artist

As featured artist

Other appearances

Notes

References

External links
 
 
 
 

Discographies of British artists
Discography
Pop music discographies